Smilets dynasty was an imperial house of Bulgaria. It is one of the smallest royal houses.

It was founded by Tsar Smilets of Bulgaria.

Members 
Smilets of Bulgaria – his parentage is unknown, but he was of noble birth and had two brothers
Smiltsena Palaiologina – wife of Smilets
Marina Smilets of Bulgaria – daughter of Smilets and Smiltsena
Teodora of Bulgaria, Queen of Serbia – daughter of Smilets and Smiltsena 
Ivan II of Bulgaria – son of Smilets and Smiltsena

Notes

 
Bulgarian noble families
13th century in Bulgaria
14th century in Bulgaria